Momonipta onorei is a moth of the family Notodontidae first described by James S. Miller in 2008. It is found in Ecuador (the provinces of Esmeraldas, Imbabura and Pichincha).

The length of the forewings is 18.5–20 mm for males and 21.5–23 mm for females. The forewings are semitransparent, without spots or a pattern of any kind. The ground color is white, dusted with brown scales, especially in the outer third. The hindwings are semitransparent with a ground color which is whiter than the forewings.

Etymology
The species is named in honor of Giovanni Onore.

References

Moths described in 2008
Notodontidae of South America